Champ is a village in St. Louis County, Missouri, United States. The population was 10 at the 2020 census.

History
Champ was founded in 1959 by Bill Bangert, a former track and field athlete who was once mayor of Berkeley, Missouri. Bangert was the mayor of Champ for 18 years, and later moved to California.
The majority of the land area of Champ is currently a landfill, which opened in 1974.  The remainder encompasses the six households listed in the 2010 census and Grace Church.

Geography
Champ is located at  (38.743529, -90.451309).

Demographics

2010 census
At the 2010 census there were 13 people, 6 households, and 3 families living in the village. The racial makeup of the village was 100.0% White.
Of the 6 households 16.7% had children under the age of 18 living with them, 50.0% were married couples living together, and 50.0% were non-families. 50.0% of households were made up of individuals. The average household size was 2.17 and the average family size was 3.33.

The median age in the village was 57.5 years. 15.4% of residents were under the age of 18; 7.7% were between the ages of 18 and 24; 23.1% were from 25 to 44; 30.8% were from 45 to 64; and 23.1% were 65 or older. The gender makeup of the village was 53.8% male and 46.2% female.

2000 census
At the 2000 census there were 12 people, 4 households, and 4 families living in the village. The population density was 14.4 people per square mile (5.5/km). There were 6 housing units at an average density of 7.2 per square mile (2.8/km).  The racial makeup of the village was 66.67% White, and 33.33% from two or more races.
Of the 4 households 50.0% had children under the age of 18 living with them, 100.0% were married couples living together, and 0.0% were non-families. No households were one person and none had someone living alone who was 65 or older. The average household size was 3.00 and the average family size was 3.00.

The age distribution was 25.0% under the age of 18, 8.3% from 18 to 24, 33.3% from 25 to 44, 25.0% from 45 to 64, and 8.3% 65 or older. The median age was 36 years. For every 100 females, there were 140.0 males. For every 100 females age 18 and over, there were 125.0 males.

The median household income was $75,487 and the median family income  was $75,487. Males had a median income of $75,487 versus $0 for females. The per capita income for the village was $18,762. None of the population and none of the families were below the poverty line.

References

Villages in St. Louis County, Missouri
Villages in Missouri